

Be

Beb-Bek 

Bebulin (Baxter International)
becampanel (INN)
becantone (INN)
becaplermin (INN)
becatecarin (USAN)
beciparcil (INN)
beclamide (INN)
beclanorsen (INN)
becliconazole (INN)
beclobrate (INN)
beclometasone (INN)
beclotiamine (INN)
Beclovent
becocalcitol (USAN)
Becomject-100
Beconase
Becotin Pulvules
bectumomab (INN)
bedaquiline (USAN, INN)
bederocin (USAN, INN)
bedoradrine (INN)
Beepen-VK
befetupitant (USAN)
befiperide (INN)
befiradol (INN)
befloxatone (INN)
befunolol (INN)
befuraline (INN)
begacestat (USAN, INN)
bekanamycin (INN)

Bel-Bem 

Bel-Phen-Ergot S
Bel-Tabs
Belagenpumatucel-L (USAN)
belaperidone (INN)
belarizine (INN)
belatacept (USAN, INN)
Beldin
belfosdil (INN)
belimumab (USAN)
belinostat (USAN, INN)
Belix
Bellafoline
Bellatal
Bellergal-S
beloranib (INN)
belotecan (USAN)
beloxamide (INN)
beloxepin (INN)
Belviq (Arena Pharmaceuticals)
bemarinone (INN)
bemegride (INN)
bemesetron (INN)
bemetizide (INN)
Bemitradine (INN)
Bemoradan (INN)
Bemote
Bemotrizinol (USAN)

Ben 
Ben-Allergin-50 Injection
Ben-Aqua

Bena-Bene 

Bena-D
benactyzine (INN)
Benadryl (Johnson & Johnson)
benafentrine (INN)
benaprizine (INN)
benaxibine (INN)
benazepril (INN)
benazeprilat (INN)
bencianol (INN)
bencisteine (INN)
benclonidine (INN)
bencyclane (INN)
bendacalol (INN)
bendamustine (INN)
bendazac (INN)
bendazol (INN)
Bendectin
benderizine (INN)
Bendopa
bendroflumethiazide (INN)
BeneFix (Wyeth/Pfizer)
Benemid
benethamine penicillin (INN)
benexate (INN)

Benf-Bens 

Benfluorex (INN)
Benfosformin (INN)
Benfotiamine (INN)
Benfurodil hemisuccinate (INN)
Benhepazone (INN)
Benicar HCT
Benicar
Benidipine (INN)
Benmoxin (INN)
Benoject
Benolizime (INN)
Benoquin
Benorilate (INN)
Benorterone (INN)
Benoxafos (INN)
Benoxaprofen (INN)
Benoxinate
Benoxyl
Benpenolisin (INN)
Benperidol (INN)
Benproperine (INN)
Benralizumab (INN)
Benrixate (INN)
Bensalan (INN)
Benserazide (INN)
Bensuldazic acid (INN)
Bensulfoid

Bent-Beny 

Bentamapimod (INN)
Bentazepam (INN)
Bentemazole (INN)
Bentiamine (INN)
Bentipimine (INN)
Bentiromide (INN)
Bentyl
Bentylol
Benurestat (INN)
Benuryl
Benylin

Benz

Benza-Benzn 

Benza
Benzac
Benzaclin
Benzacot
Benzagel
Benzalkonium chloride (INN)
Benzamycin
Benzaprinoxide (INN)
Benzarone (INN)
Benzarone (INN)
Benzashave
Benzathine benzylpenicillin (INN)
Benzatropine (INN)
Benzbromarone (INN)
Benzedrex
Benzestrol (INN)
Benzethidine (INN)
Benzethonium chloride (INN)
Benzetimide (INN)
Benzfetamine (INN)
Benzilonium bromide (INN)
Benzindopyrine (INN)
Benziodarone (INN)
Benzmalecene (INN)
Benznidazole (INN)

Benzo-Benzy 

Benzobarbital (INN)
Benzocaine (INN)
Benzoclidine (INN)
Benzocol
Benzoctamine (INN)
Benzodent
Benzodepa (INN)
Benzododecinium chloride (INN)
Benzonatate (INN)
Benzopyrronium bromide (INN)
Benzotic
Benzotript (INN)
Benzoxiquine (INN)
Benzoxonium chloride (INN)
Benzpiperylone (INN)
Benzpyrinium bromide (INN)
Benzquercin (INN)
Benzquinamide (INN)
Benzthiazide (INN)
Benztropine (INN)
Benzydamine (INN)
Benzyl Benzoate
Benzylpenicillin (INN)
Benzylsulfamide (INN)

Bep-Bes 

Bepadin
Bepafant (INN)
Beperidium iodide (INN)
Beperminogene perplasmid (INN)
Bephenium hydroxynaphthoate (INN)
Bepiastine (INN)
Bepotastine (USAN, INN)
Bepridil (INN)
Beraprost (INN)
Berefrine (INN)
Berlafenone (INN)
Bermoprofen (INN)
Berocca PN
Beroctocog alfa (INN)
Berotec
Bertilimumab (INN)
Bertosamil (INN)
Berubigen
Berupipam (INN)
Berubicin (USAN)
Bervastatin (INN)
Berythromycin (INN)
Besifloxacin hydrochloride (USAN)
Besifovir (INN)
Besigomsin (INN)
Besilesomab (INN)
Besipirdine (INN)
Besonprodil (USAN)
Besulpamide (INN)
Besunide (INN)

Bet

Beta 

Beta-2
Beta-HC
Beta-Val

Betac-Betat 

Betacarotene (INN)
Betacetylmethadol (INN)
Betachron
Betaderm
Betadex (INN)
Betadine
Betagan
Betahistine (INN)
Betaject
Betalin 12
Betalin S
Betaloc
Betameprodine (INN)
Betamethadol (INN)
Betamethasone acibutate (INN)
Betamethasone (INN)
Betamicin (INN)
Betamipron (INN)
Betanidine (INN)
Betapace
Betapar
Betapen-VK
Betaprodine (INN)
Betaprone
Betasept
Betaseron
Betasizofiran (INN)
Betatar
Betatrex

Betax-Betaz 

Betaxin
Betaxolol (INN)
Betaxon
Betazole (INN)

Beth-Betr 

Bethanechol (INN)
Betiatide (INN)
Betimol
Betnesol
Betnovate
Betoptic Pilo
Betoptic S
Betoxycaine (INN)
Betrixaban (USAN)

Bev-Bez 

Bevacizumab (INN)
Bevantolol (INN)
Bevasiranib (USAN, INN)
Bevirimat (USAN, INN)
Bevonium metilsulfate bolenol (INN)
Bexophene
Bextra
Bexxar (Corixa Corporation)
Bezafibrate (INN)
Bezalip
Bezitramide (INN)

Bg 

BG 9273